Monte Leco is a mountain in Liguria, northern Italy, part of the Ligurian Apennines.  It is located in the provinces of Genoa and Alessandria. It lies at an altitude of 1072 metres.

Access to the summit 
The mountain is easily accessible by signposted tracks departing from Bocchetta Pass or Isoverde (municipality of Campomorone).

The Alta Via dei Monti Liguri, a long-distance trail from Ventimiglia (province of Imperia) to Bolano (province of La Spezia), passes very close to the mountain's summit.

Nature conservation 
The mountain and its surrounding area are part of a SIC (Site of Community Importance) called Praglia – Pracaban – M. Leco – P. Martin  (code: IT1331501). Its northern slopes are included in the Piedmontese natural park of the Capanne di Marcarolo.

References

Mountains of Liguria
Mountains of Piedmont
One-thousanders of Italy
Natura 2000 in Italy
Mountains of the Apennines